Fabio Marco Giordano (born 6 February 1983) is an Italian footballer who plays for A.C. Jesolo.

Biography
Born in Palermo, Sicily, Giordano started his career with northern Italy side Torino Calcio. He was part of 2001-02 Primavera Under-20 team and then loaned to Pisa and Vis Pesaro. In 2004-05 season, he returned to Turin and awarded no.16 shirt. He was transferred to Sassari Torres again in January 2005. After the bankrupt of Torino and all players were allowed to leave, and Giordano joined Foggia of Serie C1.

In July 2008, he joined newly promoted Serie B side Cittadella, but loaned to Pescara on 2 February. Luca Di Matteo took his no.7 shirt in the second half of 2008-09 season.

Giordano returned to Cittadella in 2009-10 season and played the opening match as starter, but on 31 August 2009 loaned to Ravenna. Antimo Iunco, on loan from Chievo, took his no.7 shirt.

References

External links
 Profile at Ravenna 
 
 Profile at La Gazetta dello Sport (2008-09) 
 Profile at AIC.Football.it 
 

Italian footballers
Serie B players
Torino F.C. players
Pisa S.C. players
Vis Pesaro dal 1898 players
Calcio Foggia 1920 players
A.S. Cittadella players
Delfino Pescara 1936 players
Ravenna F.C. players
Association football midfielders
Footballers from Palermo
1983 births
Living people